Eukaryotic translation elongation factor 1 epsilon-1 is a protein that in humans is encoded by the EEF1E1 gene.

References

Further reading

External links